Sharov (masculine) or Sharova (feminine) is a Russian surname. It originates from the Russian slang expression шары выкатить meaning to google, to stare, where шар means eyeball rather than ball. Notable people with the surname include:

Aleksandr Sharov (footballer) (born 1981), Russian footballer
Aleksandr Grigorevich Sharov, Russian paleontologist
Brian Sharoff (1943–2020), American businessman and politician
Robert Sharoff (1922–1973), American architectural writer
Sergei Sharov (born 1992), Russian footballer
Yury Sharov (1939–2021), Soviet Russian fencer

References

Russian-language surnames